Dortches is a town in Nash County, North Carolina, United States. It is part of the Rocky Mount, North Carolina Metropolitan Statistical Area. The population was 935 in 2010.

History
The Dortch House was listed on the National Register of Historic Places in 1972.

Geography

Demographics

As of the census of 2000, there were 809 people, 329 households, and 235 families residing in the town. The population density was 105.1 people per square mile (40.6/km2). There were 351 housing units at an average density of 45.6 per square mile (17.6/km2). The racial makeup of the town was 77.75% White, 20.40% African American, 0.37% Native American, 0.12% Pacific Islander, 0.37% from other races, and 0.99% from two or more races. Hispanic or Latino of any race were 1.85% of the population.

There were 329 households, out of which 29.2% had children under the age of 18 living with them, 59.6% were married couples living together, 7.6% had a female householder with no husband present, and 28.3% were non-families. 26.1% of all households were made up of individuals, and 14.9% had someone living alone who was 65 years of age or older. The average household size was 2.46 and the average family size was 2.96.

In the town, the population was spread out, with 22.6% under the age of 18, 6.6% from 18 to 24, 25.5% from 25 to 44, 32.1% from 45 to 64, and 13.2% who were 65 years of age or older. The median age was 42 years. For every 100 females, there were 91.3 males. For every 100 females age 18 and over, there were 89.1 males.

The median income for a household in the town was $35,417, and the median income for a family was $52,250. Males had a median income of $31,635 versus $23,375 for females. The per capita income for the town was $24,287. About 1.3% of families and 4.4% of the population were below the poverty line, including 3.1% of those under age 18 and 10.1% of those age 65 or over.

References

Towns in Nash County, North Carolina
Towns in North Carolina
Rocky Mount metropolitan area